A curtain is a piece of cloth intended to block or obscure light or similar.

Curtain or curtains may also  refer to:

Arts and entertainment

Film
 Curtain (film), an American silent film
 Curtains (1983 film), a Canadian horror film
 Curtains (1995 film), a Canadian short film, in English and French, also known as Rideau

Literature
 Curtain (novel), by Agatha Christie, 1975
 The Curtain (essay), by Milan Kundera, published 2005 as Le Rideau

Music
 The Curtains, an American music group
 Curtains (John Frusciante album), 2005
 Curtains (Tindersticks album), 1997
 "Curtains" (Red Flag song), 2000
 "Curtains", a song by Elton John from the 1975 album Captain Fantastic and the Brown Dirt Cowboy
 "Curtains", B-side of "Big Time" (Peter Gabriel song), 1986
 Cortina (tango), or curtain, short pieces of music between dances at a tango event

Theatre equipment
 Front curtain
 Safety curtain
 Theater drapes and stage curtains

Theatres
 Curtain Theatre, a former Elizabethan playhouse in London
 Curtain Theatre (Glasgow), a Scottish theatre company in the 1930s

Other uses in arts and entertainment
 Curtains (musical), a musical mystery comedy first produced in 2006
 "Curtains" (Under the Dome), episode of TV drama

People

 Elizabeth Curtain, former Australian judge
 Peter Curtain (born 1962), former Australian rules footballer
 Ruth F. Curtain (1941–2018), Australian mathematician

Other uses
 Curtain array antenna
 Curtained hair or curtains, a hairstyle featuring a long fringe 
 Shutter curtains,  a form of shutter (photography)

See also

Air curtain (disambiguation)
Curtain call (disambiguation)
Curtain wall (disambiguation)
Curtin (disambiguation)
Iron Curtain (disambiguation)
McCurtain (disambiguation) 
Rideau (disambiguation) (French, 'curtain')
Curtain coating, a process that creates a curtain of fluid that falls onto a substrate
Flowstone, curtain-like mineral deposits in caves